Xesús Lorenzo Varela Vázquez (August 10, 1917 in Havana – November 25, 1978 in Madrid) was a Galician poet.

Life
Varela was born in a boat, while his parents, emigrants from Galicia, were going to Havana, Cuba. Some people consider it to be a kind of prophecy, as Varela lived in exile for most of his life.

Varela returned to Galicia and grew up in Lugo. He was an active member of the Federación de Mocedades Galeguistas (Federation of Galician Youth).

In 1934 Varela moved to Madrid, where he contacted with the group PAN (Poetas Andantes y Navegantes, literally Walking and Sailing Poets — note that the abbreviation makes reference to Pan, a Greek god, and is also the Spanish and Galician word for bread) and with Misións Pedagóxicas (Pedagogic Missions). He also joined the Communist Party of Spain (Partido Comunista de España or PCE).

After the Spanish Civil War (1936–1939), Varela left Spain, exiling himself first in France and then, in May 1939, in Mexico. He moved to Buenos Aires in 1941, where he made contact with other exiled Galicians and emigrants from Galicia. He would publish most of his poetry, in the Galician language, while in Argentina.

In May 1976, after the death of caudillo Francisco Franco, Varela decided to return to Spain. He finally settled in Madrid, where he lived until his death two years later.

The Día das Letras Galegas ("Galician Literature Day") was dedicated to him in 2005.

Works
 Catro poemas galegos pra catro grabados, 1944
 Lonxe, 1954
 Federico García Lorca. Canciones y Poemas. Selection of poems by García Lorca read by Lorenzo Varela. Recording by Discos Qualiton QH-2000/2001  
 Poesías, 1979
 Poesía galega, 1990

1917 births
1978 deaths
People from Havana
Galician diaspora
Galician poets
Cuban people of Galician descent
Exiles of the Spanish Civil War in Argentina
Spanish expatriates in Argentina
Spanish expatriates in Uruguay
Galician-language writers
20th-century Spanish poets
Spanish male poets
Exiles of the Spanish Civil War in France
Exiles of the Spanish Civil War in Mexico
20th-century Spanish male writers